Thorar is a town in Poonch District in Azad Kashmir. It is located about 20 miles from Rawalakot city, the capital of Poonch district.

Location 

Thorar is a Tehsil of District Poonch (Rawalakot), Azad Kashmir, and is connected to Rawalakot and Muzaffarabad by main roads. Its suburbs are Tain, Mang, Jassapeer, Bhalgran, Nar, Bosa Gala and Androt, Kheruta, Siranagala. The literacy rate in Thorar is over 75%.
There is one Govt. Boys Degree College, Govt. Girls College and some private colleges and schools for boys and girls some of which are Ghzaia-e- Millat public school Thorar, 
Bright Future Public School Thorar, Little Angles public School Thorar and Iqra Public School Thorar

Occupation
There are very few job opportunities compared to the size of population. People of Thorar are educated and few of them work in schools or services sector in Government of Azad Kashmir
Most of the people from this area (almost 60%) work in foreign countries like Saudi Arabia, UAE and many more.

Cricket is the most popular sports, volleyball is also played in some areas, Every year a big tournament of volleyball is arranged in which players from the whole country participate.

Shopping 
The town has few good bazaars where all essential commodities of life are easily available.

Pictures

See also
Bhalgran
Tain
Nar A.K

References

Notes

Citations 

2005 Kashmir earthquake
Poonch District, Pakistan